Mongol invasion of East Asia may refer to:

 Mongol conquests of East Asia, general information about Mongol conquests
 Mongol invasion of Central Asia, from 1206 to 1221, Genghis Khan's armies expanded the Mongol Empire after the unification of the Mongol/Turkic tribes. This period was considered to end with the conquering of the Khwarizmian Empire.
 Mongol invasion of China, lasting six decades, culminated with the fall of the Chinese Song Dynasty in 1279
 Mongol invasions of Korea, a series of campaigns by the Mongol Empire against Korea, then known as Goryeo, from 1231 to 1270
 Mongol invasions of Japan, unsuccessful attempts by Kublai Khan in 1274 and 1281 to invade Japan
 Mongol invasions of Vietnam, three major campaigns between 1257 and 1288